Paramjit Singh (born August 22, 1971) is an Indian athlete who competed in the 400m at the 2000 Olympics.

In 1998 Paramjit Singh broke the 38-year-old National record for the 400m that had been set by Milkha Singh. He was  also part of the Indian relay team that won a silver medal in the 4 x 400 m relay at the 1998 Asian Games. The team set the Indian national record in the event.

References

Living people
1971 births
Indian male sprinters
Athletes (track and field) at the 2000 Summer Olympics
Olympic athletes of India
Athletes (track and field) at the 2002 Asian Games
Athletes (track and field) at the 1998 Asian Games
Asian Games medalists in athletics (track and field)
Asian Games silver medalists for India
Asian Games bronze medalists for India
Medalists at the 1998 Asian Games
Recipients of the Arjuna Award